Still Life at the Penguin Cafe is a ballet choreographed by David Bintley and featuring music composed by Simon Jeffes, founder of the Penguin Cafe Orchestra.  It is also the title of the accompanying album.  Geoffrey Richardson co-wrote one of the pieces.

The ballet's debut production in 1988 was performed by The Royal Ballet at Covent Garden, in England. The ballet was conceived by David Bintley (at that time resident choreographer at Covent Garden), who approached Simon Jeffes about the music that was to be used in the choreography. The music for the ballet was drawn from several musical pieces composed by Jeffes before the ballet was conceived, composed during the period 1981 to 1987. Most of the pieces were originally written for small ensembles, consisting of, for example, violin, cello, guitar and piano. Jeffes orchestrated the pieces for the ballet, and in the Royal Ballet production, they were performed by a full orchestra. The ballet was filmed in 1988 by Thames Television and commercially released. The name of the ballet is derived from that of the Penguin Cafe Orchestra, which was Simon Jeffes' ensemble.

Ballet story 
The pieces / sections in the ballet are:

 The Penguin Cafe (musical piece Air à Danser)
 Utah Longhorn Ram (musical piece Prelude and Yodel)
 Texan Kangaroo Rat (musical piece Long Distance, original title Horns of a Bull)
 Humboldt's Hog Nosed Skunk Flea (musical piece The Ecstasy of the Dancing Flea, original title Pythagoras's Trousers)
 Southern Cape Zebra (SCZ) (musical piece White Mischief)
 Rain Forest People (musical piece Now Nothing)
 Brazilian Woolly Monkey (musical piece Music By Numbers)
 Conclusion (musical piece Numbers 1–4)

Story line 

The ballet begins with a voice-over (by Jeremy Irons) describing how the great auk was very recently made extinct by man. The initial segment is set in a cafe, and several humans and penguins dance. Each subsequent segment prior to the conclusion shows an endangered species (or, in the case of the Rain Forest People, a culture.) The conclusion shows all the characters withstanding a downpour, and gathering on an ark-like boat.

The overall theme of the ballet is pro-environment, pro-conservation. The ballet seeks to make the audience more aware of endangered species.

Production Details 

From the 1988 production:
 Performed by the Royal Ballet
 Composed by Simon Jeffes  (Geoffrey Richardson  co-composed "Brazilian Woolly Monkey" i.e. "Music by Numbers")
 Choreographed by David Bintley
 Designed by Hayden Griffin
 Music performed by The Orchestra of the Royal Opera House, Covent Garden
 Conducted by Isaiah Jackson
 Narrated by Jeremy Irons

Dancers 
 Utah Longhorn Ram - Deborah Bull
 Ram Partner - Guy Niblett
 Texan Kangaroo Rat - Bruce Sansom
 Humboldt's Hog-nosed Skunk Flea - Fiona Brockway
 Southern Cape Zebra - Phillip Broomhead
 Rainforest People - Tracy Brown, Jonathan Cope, Michelle di Lorenzo
 Brazilian Woolly Monkey - Stephen Jefferies
 The Great Auk - Nicola Roberts

Recordings and publications 

 Laser Disk: London/Decca #071 222-1 (1991). See production details above for choreographer, etc. Out of print.
 Sheet music, arranged for piano by Henry Roche. Published by Peters Edition Ltd (London) 2002; . Still in print as of November 2007.
 VHS tape — Polygram Records; ASIN 630202367X, 1992. Out of print.
 DVD — Published by ArtHaus. ASIN: B000Y351ZC. In print since January 2008.

Both the Laser Disk and DVD contain a 50-minute documentary on the Penguin Cafe Orchestra.

Album 

The music for the ballet was released as an album, under Jeffes' name, together with an 18-minute suite called Four Pieces for Orchestra, comprising orchestral recordings of earlier PCO tracks:

 Perpetuum mobile
 Southern Jukebox Music
 Oscar Tango
 Music for a Found Harmonium

 CD: Polygram records (1991) ASIN B00000E42T. BBC Orchestra, conducted by Barry Wordsworth. Out of print but available as a digital download.

Footnotes

External links 
 NY Times review
 Teachers info about the ballet

Ballets by David Bintley
Ballets by Simon Jeffes
1988 ballet premieres